is a Japanese football club based in Nagasaki, Capital of Nagasaki Prefecture. They currently play in J2 League, the Japanese second tier professional in football league.

History 
The club was established in 1985 as Ariake SC until the club decided to merge with Kunimi FC in 2004. The merger led the club to adopt the new name V-Varen Nagasaki in 2005, which has been used ever since.

V-Varen Nagasaki, since 2006, had been contending for the Kyūshū Soccer League championship and thus a place in the Japan Football League, but they only won it in November 2008, as second place in the Regional League promotion series.

In January 2009, they applied for J. League Associate Membership and their application was accepted at the J. League board meeting in February. In 2012, they won the Japan Football League title and thus promotion to the J. League Division 2. Five years later they won promotion to the J1 League for the first time after finishing runners-up in the 2017 season.

J. League: 2013 –
In preparation for the club's first season in the J. League Division 2 the club hired local-born Takuya Takagi as their coach for the season. On 3 March 2013 V-Varen Nagasaki played in their first ever J. League Division 2 match against Fagiano Okayama at the Kanko Stadium in Okayama in which the club drew the match 1–1 with Kōichi Satō scoring the first J. League Division 2 goal for V-Varen Nagasaki in the 25th minute. The club then played their first home match in the J. League Division 2 on 10 March 2013 at the Nagasaki Athletic Stadium against former J. League champions Gamba Osaka in which V-Varen Nagasaki lost 3–1 in front of a huge crowd of 18,153.

The club gained promotion into the J. League Division 2 in 2012 for the first time in their history after finishing as the champions in the 2012 Japan Football League and hired Nagasaki native Takuya Takagi to coach the club for the 2013 season.

On 11 November 2017, the club clinched promotion to the J1 League for the first time in their history after a 3-1 home win over Kamatamare Sanuki.

Financial troubles 
After facing dire financial difficulties, on 8 March 2017 the club was purchased by Japanet Holdings, the parent company of Japanese television shopping giant Japanet Takata Co.,Ltd., becoming a fully owned subsidiary. Japanet have invested significant sums into the club, securing promotion to the top tier of Japanese football and publishing plans to build a new football-specific stadium on the former site of Mitsubishi's Nagasaki shipbuilding operations, opening in 2023.

Club name 
The "V" in the club's name comes from the Portuguese word vitória (meaning 'victory') as well as the Dutch word vrede (meaning 'peace'), while varen is the Dutch verb meaning 'to sail', relating to Nagasaki's heritage as port of call of Portuguese and Dutch traders during the sakoku period in the Tokugawa shogunate (see Dejima).

Stadium 
V-Varen Nagasaki will have Transcosmos Stadium Nagasaki as its home stadium until 2023.

Their new stadium, Peace Stadium Connected by Softbank, has been in construction since 2022, and its scheduled to be completed around August 2024. The club plans to the new stadium on September 2024. Softbank signed a sponsor partnership with V-Varen for 4 years.

League and cup record 

Key
 Pos. = Position in league; P = Games played; W = Games won; D = Games drawn; L = Games lost; F = Goals scored; A = Goals conceded; GD = Goals difference; Pts = Points gained
 Attendance/G = Average home league attendance 
 † 2020 & 2021 seasons attendances reduced by COVID-19 worldwide pandemic 
Source: J.League Data Site

Honours 
J2 League
Runners-up (1): 2017

Japan Football League
Winners (1): 2012

Regional Football League Competition
Runners-up (1): 2008

Kyūshū Soccer League
Runners-up (1): 2008

Current squad 
As of 10 March 2023.

Out on loan

Coaching staff 
For the 2023 season.

Managerial history

Kit evolution

References

External links
 Official website 

 
Football clubs in Japan
Association football clubs established in 2005
2005 establishments in Japan
Sports teams in Nagasaki Prefecture
Japan Football League clubs
J.League clubs